Los amores de Laurita is a 1986  Argentine drama film written and directed by Antonio Ottone.

It was based on the novel by Ana María Shua.

The picture starred Alberto Fernández de Rosa, and others.

Cast
 Alicia Zanca
 Daniel Fanego
 Manuel Callau
 Raúl Rizzo
 Gustavo Rey
 Alberto Fernández de Rosa
 Horacio Ranieri
 Gustavo Garzón
 Víctor Laplace
 Ana María Caso
 Pablo Brichta
 Margara Alonso
 Alberto Busaid
 Mario Luciani
 Robertino Granados

Footnotes

External links
 Los amores de Laurita at the cinenacional.com .
 

1986 films
Argentine independent films
1980s Spanish-language films
1986 drama films
Argentine drama films
1986 independent films
1980s Argentine films